The Carnation Revolution, also known as the 25 April, was a military coup by left-leaning military officers that overthrew the authoritarian Estado Novo regime on 25 April 1974 in Lisbon, producing major social, economic, territorial, demographic, and political changes in Portugal and its overseas colonies through the Processo Revolucionário Em Curso. It resulted in the Portuguese transition to democracy and the end of the Portuguese Colonial War.

The revolution began as a coup organised by the Armed Forces Movement (MFA), composed of military officers who opposed the regime, but it was soon coupled with an unanticipated, popular civil resistance campaign. Negotiations with African independence movements began, and by the end of 1974, Portuguese troops were withdrawn from Portuguese Guinea, which became a UN member state. This was followed in 1975 by the independence of Cape Verde, Mozambique, São Tomé and Príncipe and Angola in Africa and the declaration of independence of East Timor in Southeast Asia. These events prompted a mass exodus of Portuguese citizens from Portugal's African territories (mostly from Angola and Mozambique), creating over a million Portuguese refugees – the retornados.

The Carnation Revolution got its name from the fact that almost no shots were fired and from restaurant worker Celeste Caeiro offering carnations to the soldiers when the population took to the streets to celebrate the end of the dictatorship, with other demonstrators following suit and carnations placed in the muzzles of guns and on the soldiers' uniforms. In Portugal, 25 April is a national holiday (Freedom Day) that commemorates the revolution.

Background

By the 1970s, nearly a half-century of authoritarian rule weighed on Portugal. The 28 May 1926 coup d'état implemented an authoritarian regime incorporating social Catholicism and integralism. In 1933, the regime was renamed Estado Novo (New State). António de Oliveira Salazar served as Prime Minister until 1968.

In sham elections the government candidate usually ran unopposed, while the opposition used the limited political freedoms allowed during the brief election period to protest, withdrawing their candidates before the election to deny the regime political legitimacy. 

The Estado Novo's political police, the PIDE (Polícia Internacional e de Defesa do Estado, later the DGS, Direcção-Geral de Segurança and originally the PVDE, Polícia de Vigilância e Defesa do Estado), persecuted opponents of the regime, who were often tortured, imprisoned or killed.

In 1958, General Humberto Delgado, a former member of the regime, stood against the regime's presidential candidate, Américo Tomás, and refused to allow his name to be withdrawn.
Tomás won the election amidst claims of widespread electoral fraud, and the Salazar government abandoned the practice of popularly electing the president and gave the task to the National Assembly.

Portugal's Estado Novo government remained neutral in the second world war, and was initially tolerated by its NATO post-war partners due to its anti-communist stance. As the Cold War developed, Western and Eastern-bloc states vied against each other by supporting guerrillas in the Portuguese colonies, leading to the 1961–1974 Portuguese Colonial War.

Salazar had a stroke in 1968, and was replaced as prime minister by Marcello Caetano, who adopted a slogan of "continuous evolution", suggesting reforms, such as a monthly pension to rural workers who had never contributed to Portugal's social security. Caetano's Primavera Marcelista (Marcelist Spring) included greater political tolerance and freedom of the press, and was seen as an opportunity for the opposition to gain concessions from the regime. Portugal had a taste of democracy in 1969, and Caetano authorised the country's first democratic labour-union movement since the 1920s. However, after the elections of 1969 and 1973, hard liners in government and the military pushed back against Caetano, with political repression against communists and anti-colonialists.

Economic conditions

The Estado Novo regime's economic policy encouraged the formation of large conglomerates. The regime maintained a policy of corporatism which resulted in the placement of much of the economy in the hands of conglomerates including those founded by the families of António Champalimaud (Banco Totta & Açores, Banco Pinto & Sotto Mayor, Secil, Cimpor), José Manuel de Mello (Companhia União Fabril), Américo Amorim (Corticeira Amorim) and the dos Santos family (Jerónimo Martins).

One of the largest was the Companhia União Fabril (CUF), with a wide range of interests including cement, petro and agro chemicals, textiles, beverages, naval and electrical engineering, insurance, banking, paper, tourism and mining, with branches, plants and projects throughout the Portuguese Empire.

Other medium-sized family companies specialised in textiles (such as those in Covilhã and the northwest), ceramics, porcelain, glass and crystal (such as those in Alcobaça, Caldas da Rainha and Marinha Grande), engineered wood (such as SONAE, near Porto), canned fish (Algarve and the northwest), fishing, food and beverages (liqueurs, beer and port wine), tourism (in Estoril, Cascais, Sintra and the Algarve) and agriculture (the Alentejo, known as the breadbasket of Portugal) by the early-1970s. Rural families engaged in agriculture and forestry.

Income from the colonies came from resource extraction, of oil, coffee, cotton, cashews, coconuts, timber, minerals (including diamonds), metals (such as iron and aluminium), bananas, citrus, tea, sisal, beer, cement, fish and other seafood, beef and textiles. Labour unions were prohibited, and minimum wage laws were not enforced. Starting in the 1960s, the outbreak of colonial wars in Africa set off significant social changes, among them the rapid incorporation of women into the labour market.

Colonial war

Independence movements began in the African colonies of Portuguese Mozambique, Portuguese Congo, Portuguese Angola, and Portuguese Guinea. The Salazar and Caetano regimes responded with diverting more and more of Portugal's budget to colonial administration and military expenditure, and the country became increasingly isolated from the rest of the world, facing increasing internal dissent, arms embargoes and other international sanctions.

By the early-1970s, the Portuguese military was overstretched and there was no political solution in sight. Although the number of casualties was relatively small, the war had entered its second decade; Portugal faced criticism from the international community, and was becoming increasingly isolated. Atrocities such as the Wiriyamu Massacre undermined the war's popularity and the government's diplomatic position, although details of the massacre are still disputed.

The war became unpopular in Portugal, and the country became increasingly polarised. Thousands of left-wing students and anti-war activists avoided conscription by emigrating illegally, primarily to France and the United States. Meanwhile three generations of right-wing militants in Portuguese schools were guided by a revolutionary nationalism partially influenced by European neo-fascism, and supported the Portuguese Empire and an authoritarian regime.

The war had a profound impact on the country.  The revolutionary Armed Forces Movement (MFA) began as an attempt to liberate Portugal from the Estado Novo regime and challenge new military laws which were coming into force. The laws would reduce the military budget and reformulate the Portuguese military. Younger military-academy graduates resented  Caetano's programme of commissioning militia officers who completed a brief training course and had served in the colonies' defensive campaigns at the same rank as academy graduates.

Revolution

In February 1974, Caetano decided to remove General António de Spínola from the command of Portuguese forces in Guinea in the face of Spínola's increasing disagreement with the promotion of military officers and the direction of Portuguese colonial policy. This occurred shortly after the publication of Spínola's book, Portugal and the Future, which expressed his political and military views of the Portuguese Colonial War. Several military officers who opposed the war formed the MFA to overthrow the government in a military coup. The MFA was headed by Vítor Alves, Otelo Saraiva de Carvalho and Vasco Lourenço, and was joined later by Salgueiro Maia. The movement was aided by other Portuguese army officers who supported Spínola and democratic civil and military reform. It is speculated that Francisco da Costa Gomes actually led the revolution.

The coup had two secret signals. First, Paulo de Carvalho's "E Depois do Adeus" (Portugal's entry in the 1974 Eurovision Song Contest) was aired on Emissores Associados de Lisboa at 10:55 p.m. on 24 April. This alerted rebel captains and soldiers to begin the coup. The second signal came at 12:20 a.m. on 25 April, when Rádio Renascença broadcast "Grândola, Vila Morena" (a song by Zeca Afonso, an influential political folk musician and singer who was banned from Portuguese radio at the time). The MFA gave the signals to take over strategic points of power in the country.

Six hours later, the Caetano government relented. Despite repeated radio appeals from the "captains of April" (the MFA) advising civilians to stay home, thousands of Portuguese took to the streets – mingling with, and supporting, the military insurgents. A central gathering point was the Lisbon flower market, then richly stocked with carnations (which were in season). Some of the insurgents put carnations in their gun barrels, an image broadcast on television worldwide which gave the revolution its name. Although no mass demonstrations preceded the coup, spontaneous civilian involvement turned the military coup into a popular revolution "led by radical army officers, soldiers, workers and peasants that toppled the senile Salazar dictatorship, using the language of socialism and democracy. The attempt to radicalise the outcome", noted a contemporary observer of the time, "had little mass support and was easily suppressed by the Socialist Party and its allies."

Caetano found refuge in the main headquarters of the Lisbon military police, the National Republican Guard, at the Largo do Carmo. This building was surrounded by the MFA, which pressured him to cede power to General Spínola. Caetano and President Américo Tomás fled to Brazil; Caetano spent the rest of his life there, and Tomás returned to Portugal a few years later. The revolution was closely watched by neighbouring Spain, where the government (and the opposition) were planning the succession of Spanish dictator Francisco Franco. Franco died a year and a half later, in 1975.

Four civilians were shot dead by government forces under the Directorate General of Security, whose personnel involved were later arrested by the MFA for their murders.

Aftermath

After the coup, power was held by the National Salvation Junta (a military junta). Portugal experienced a turbulent period, known as the Processo Revolucionário Em Curso (Ongoing Revolutionary Process).

The conservative forces surrounding Spinola and the MFA radicals initially confronted each other (covertly or overtly), and Spinola was forced to appoint key MFA figures to senior security positions. Right-wing military figures attempted an unsuccessful counter-coup, resulting in Spinola's removal from office. Unrest within the MFA between leftist forces (often close to the Communist Party) and more-moderate groups (often allied with the Socialists) eventually led to the group's splintering and dissolution.

This stage of the PREC lasted until the Coup of 25 November 1975, led by a group of far-left officers, specifically Otelo Saraiva de Carvalho. It was characterised as a Communist plot to seize power in order to discredit the powerful Communist Party. It was followed by a successful counter-coup by more centrist officers, and was marked by constant friction between liberal-democratic forces and leftist-communist political parties. Portugal's first free election was held on 25 April 1975 to write a new constitution replacing the Constitution of 1933, which prevailed during the Estado Novo era. Another election was held in 1976 and the first constitutional government, led by centre-left socialist Mário Soares, took office.

Decolonisation

Before April 1974, the intractable Portuguese Colonial War in Africa consumed up to 40 percent of the Portuguese budget. Although part of Guinea-Bissau became independent de facto in 1973, Bissau (its capital) and the large towns were still under Portuguese control. In Angola and Mozambique, independence movements were active in more remote rural areas from which the Portuguese Army had retreated.

A consequence of the Carnation Revolution was the sudden withdrawal of Portuguese administrative and military personnel from its overseas colonies. Hundreds of thousands of Portuguese Africans returned to Portugal. These people—workers, small businesspeople, and farmers—often had deep roots in the former colonies and became known as the retornados.

Angola began a decades-long civil war which involved the Soviet Union, Cuba, South Africa, and the United States. Millions of Angolans died in the aftermath of independence due to armed conflict, malnutrition and disease. After a brief period of stability, Mozambique became embroiled in a civil war which left it one of the poorest nations in the world. The country's situation has improved since the 1990s, and multi-party elections have been held.

East Timor was invaded by Indonesia, and would be occupied until 1999. There were an estimated 102,800 conflict-related deaths from 1974 to 1999 (about 18,600 killings and 84,200 deaths from hunger and illness), most of which occurred during the Indonesian occupation.

After a long period of one-party rule, Guinea-Bissau experienced a brief civil war and a difficult transition to civilian rule in 1998. Cape Verde and São Tomé and Príncipe avoided civil war during the decolonisation period, and established multi-party political systems by the early 1990s. By a treaty signed in 1974, Portugal recognised the incorporation of former Portuguese India into India. A 1978 Portuguese offer to return Macau to China was rebuffed as the Chinese government did not want to potentially jeopardize negotiations with the UK over returning Hong Kong. The territory remained a Portuguese colony until 1999, when China took control in a joint declaration and enacted a "one country, two systems" policy similar to that of Hong Kong.

Economic issues

The Portuguese economy changed significantly between 1961 and 1973. Total output (GDP at factor cost) had grown by 120 percent in real terms. The pre-revolutionary period was characterised by robust annual growth in GDP (6.9 percent), industrial production (nine percent), consumption (6.5 percent), and gross fixed capital formation (7.8 percent). The revolutionary period experienced a slowly-growing economy, whose only impetus was its 1986 entrance into the European Economic Community. Although Portugal never regained its pre-revolution growth, at the time of the revolution it was an underdeveloped country with poor infrastructure, inefficient agriculture and some of the worst health and education indicators in Europe.

Pre-revolutionary Portugal had some social and economic achievements. After a long period of economic decline before 1914, the Portuguese economy recovered slightly until 1950. It began a period of economic growth in common with Western Europe, of which it was the poorest country until the 1980s. Portuguese economic growth between 1960 and 1973 (under the Estado Novo regime) created an opportunity for integration with the developed economies of Western Europe despite the colonial war. Through emigration, trade, tourism and foreign investment, individuals and companies changed their patterns of production and consumption. The increasing complexity of a growing economy sparked new technical and organisational challenges.

On 13 November 1972, Fundo do Ultramar (The Overseas Fund, a sovereign wealth fund) was enacted with Decreto-Lei n.º 448/ /72 and the Ministry of Defense ordinance Portaria 696/72 to finance the war. The increasing burden of the war effort meant that the government had to find continuous sources of financing. Decretos-Leis n.os 353, de 13 de Julho de 1973, e 409, de 20 de Agosto were enforced to reduce military expenses and increase the number of officers by incorporating militia and military-academy officers as equals.

In January 1976, The government pledged to restore the illegally-occupied land to its owners in 1976, and enacted the Land Reform Review Law the following year. Restoration of illegally-occupied land began in 1978.

In 1960, Portugal's per-capita GDP was 38 percent of the European Economic Community average. By the end of the Salazar period in 1968 it had risen to 48 percent, and in 1973 it had reached 56.4 percent; the percentages were affected by the 40 percent of the budget which underwrote the African wars. In 1975 (the year of greatest revolutionary turmoil), Portugal's per-capita GDP declined to 52.3 percent of the EEC average. Due to revolutionary economic policies, oil shocks, recession in Europe and the return of hundreds of thousands of overseas Portuguese from its former colonies, Portugal began an economic crisis in 1974–1975.

Real gross domestic product growth resumed as a result of Portugal's economic resurgence since 1985 and adhesion to the European Economic Community (EEC). The country's 1991 per-capita GDP reached 54.9 percent of the EEC average, slightly exceeding the level at the height of the revolutionary period.

A January 2011 story in the Diário de Notícias (a Portuguese tabloid newspaper) reported that the government of Portugal encouraged overspending and investment bubbles in public-private partnerships between 1974 and 2010, and the economy has been damaged by risky credit, public debt creation, overstaffing in the public sector, a rigid labor market and mismanaged European Union's structural and cohesion funds for almost four decades. Prime Minister José Sócrates' cabinet was unable to foresee or forestall this when symptoms first appeared in 2005, and could not ameliorate the situation when Portugal was on the verge of bankruptcy in 2011 and required financial assistance from the International Monetary Fund and the European Union.

Freedom of religion
The constitution of 1976 guarantees all religions the right to practice, and non-Catholic groups are recognised as legal entities with the right to assemble. Non-Catholic conscientious objectors have the right to apply for alternative military service. The Catholic Church, however, still sought to impede other missionary activity.

The ban on Jehovah's Witnesses activity was abolished. The Witnesses were registered as a religious organisation in December 1976, and organised their first Portuguese international convention in Lisbon in 1978.

Results
After an early period of turmoil, Portugal emerged as a democratic country. The country divested itself of almost all of its former colonies and experienced severe economic turmoil. For the Portuguese and their former colonies this was a very difficult period, but civil rights and political freedoms were achieved.

Legacy

Construction of what is now called the 25 de Abril Bridge began on 5 November 1962. It opened on 6 August 1966 as the Salazar Bridge, named after Estado Novo leader António de Oliveira Salazar. Soon after the Carnation Revolution of 1974, the bridge was renamed the 25 de Abril Bridge to commemorate the revolution. Citizens who removed the large, brass "Salazar" sign from a main pillar of the bridge and painting a provisional "25 de Abril" in its place were recorded on film.

Many Portuguese streets and squares are named vinte e cinco de Abril (25 April), for the day of the revolution. The Portuguese Mint chose the 40th anniversary of the Carnation Revolution for its 2014 2 euro commemorative coin.

Freedom Day
Freedom Day (25 April) is a national holiday, with state-sponsored and spontaneous commemorations of the civil liberties and political freedoms achieved after the revolution. It commemorates the 25 April 1974 revolution and Portugal's first free elections on that date the following year.

Films
 Setúbal, ville rouge (France–Portugal 1975 documentary, b/w and colour, 16 mm, 93 minutes, by Daniel Edinger) – In October 1975 Setúbal, neighbourhood committees, factory committees, soldiers' committees and peasant cooperatives organise a central committee.
 Cravos de Abril (April Carnations), 1976 documentary, b/w and colour, 16 mm, 28 minutes, by Ricardo Costa – Depicts the revolutionary events from 24 April to 1 May 1974, illustrated by the French cartoonist Siné.
 Scenes from the Class Struggle in Portugal  – U.S.–Portugal 1977, 16 mm, b/w and colour, 85 minutes, directed by Robert Kramer
  (The Hour of Freedom), 1999 documentary, by Joana Pontes,  and 
 Capitães de Abril (April Captains), a 2000 dramatic film by Maria de Medeiros about the Carnation Revolution
 25 de Abril: uma Aventura para a Democracia (25th April: an Adventure for Democracy), 2000 documentary, by Edgar Pêra
 The BBC-made A New Sun is Born, a two-part television series, for the UK's Open University. The first episode details the coup, and the second narrates the transition to democracy.
 Longwave (Les Grandes Ondes (à l'ouest)), a 2013 screwball comedy about Swiss radio reporters assigned to Portugal in 1974
 The GDR made several films about the revolution and transmitted on state television, including, (Lourenço und der Lieutenant) and (Sta Vitoria gibt nicht auf).

See also
Aster Revolution
Armed Revolutionary Action

References

Further reading
 Barker, Collin. Revolutionary Rehearsals. Haymarket Books. First Edition, 1 December 2002. .
 Chilcote, Ronald. The Portuguese Revolution: State and Class in the Transition to Democracy. Rowman & Littlefield Publishers. 2012 .
 Phil Mailer, Portugal: The Impossible Revolution? (All sixteen chapters and the introduction by Maurice Brinton)
 Ferreira, Hugo Gil, and Marshall, Michael William. "Portugal's Revolution: 10 years on". Cambridge University Press, 303 pages, 1986. 
 Green, Gil. Portugal's Revolution. 99 pages. International Publishers. First Edition, 1976. .
 Mailer, Phil. Portugal: The Impossible Revolution? PM Press. 2nd ed. 2012. 
 Maxwell, Kenneth, 'Portugal: "The Revolution of the Carnations", 1974–75', in Adam Roberts and Timothy Garton Ash (eds.), Civil Resistance and Power Politics: The Experience of Non-violent Action from Gandhi to the Present. Oxford & New York: Oxford University Press, 2009, pp. 144–161. .
 Wise, Audrey. Eyewitness in Revolutionary Portugal. Bertrand Russell Peace Foundation for Spokesman Books, 72 pages, 1975
 Wright, George. The Destruction of a Nation: United States Policy Towards Angola Since 1945,

External links

 Accounts of the Carnation Revolution by U.S. diplomats Association for Diplomatic Studies and Training (ADST)

 
1970s coups d'état and coup attempts
1974 in Portugal
20th-century revolutions
Anti-fascism
April 1974 events in Europe
Cold War rebellions
Colour revolutions
Conflicts in 1974
Military coups in Portugal
Nonviolent revolutions
Revolutions in Portugal
Decolonization
Democratization